Saint Ambrose barring Theodosius from Milan Cathedral is a painting of  by Anthony van Dyck in the National Gallery, London.

It draws heavily on a 1618 treatment of the same subject by Peter Paul Rubens, on which van Dyck had worked as a studio assistant. In van Dyck's version, Theodosius is beardless, the architectural background is more defined, a spear and a halberd are added on the left-hand side and a dog in the bottom-left.

The painting depicts the Roman emperor Theodosius I and his entourage being barred from Milan Cathedral by its archbishop Saint Ambrose, as punishment for the Massacre of Thessalonica.

Sources
National Gallery, St Ambrose barring Theodosius from Milan Cathedral

Bibliography
Gian Pietro Bellori, Vite de' pittori, scultori e architecti moderni, Torino, Einaudi, 1976.
Didier Bodart, Van Dyck, Prato, Giunti, 1997.
Christopher Brown, Van Dyck 1599–1641, Milano, RCS Libri, 1999.
Justus Müller Hofstede, Van Dyck, Milano, Rizzoli/Skira, 2004.
Stefano Zuffi, Il Barocco, Verona, Mondadori, 2004.

1620 paintings
Paintings by Anthony van Dyck
Collections of the National Gallery, London
Paintings of Ambrose